The 2020 IMSA SportsCar Championship was the 50th racing season sanctioned by the International Motor Sports Association (IMSA) (which traces its lineage back to the 1971 IMSA GT Championship). This was also the seventh United SportsCar Championship season and fifth under the name as the WeatherTech SportsCar Championship. The series began on January 25 with the 24 Hours of Daytona, and ended on November 14 with the 12 Hours of Sebring.

Series news
 On September 19, 2019, Scott Atherton announced he'd be retiring from his position as President of the International Motor Sports Association at the end of the 2019 season. On October 15, IMSA would confirm then-team principal of Mazda Team Joest, John Doonan, to be Atherton's replacement.
 On November 1, 2019, IMSA announced a series of changes to the WeatherTech SportsCar Championship Sporting Regulations, effective for the 2020 season. The changes announced included the addition of a "premium" package for GT Daytona (GTD) teams participating in the full season, as well as a requirement of Bronze-rated drivers in the Le Mans Prototype (LMP2) class, among other changes.

Classes
 Daytona Prototype international (DPi)
 Le Mans Prototype 2 (LMP2)
 GT Le Mans (GTLM)
 GT Daytona (GTD)

Rule changes
Changes were made to the amount of practice time for amateur drivers in the LMP2 and GTD classes. Each class will have a longer dedicated free practice session for Bronze and Silver-rated drivers, set at 30 minutes long. All teams participating in such practice will also receive extra sets of tires provided by the series' tire supplier, Michelin. In addition, each LMP2 team may enter one Platinum driver at Daytona, because of the length of that round. Platinum drivers are prohibited in all other LMP2 events.

Schedule
The schedule was re-released on August 1, 2020 and featured 11 rounds.

Notes

COVID-19 pandemic schedule changes

Originally announced on August 2, 2019, the IMSA schedule was revised as a result of the coronavirus pandemic with changes announced May 15, June 25, and August 1.  At the time the 12 Hours of Sebring (March 21) postponement was announced March 12 because of the pandemic and the travel ban, the Long Beach (April 18), Detroit (May 30), and Mosport (July 5) races were officially cancelled by authorities and removed from the first revision on May 15.  At that point, standard-distance races were added to Daytona (July 4) and Sebring (July 11).  Mid-Ohio was moved from May 3 to September 27.  The 6 Hours of Watkins Glen, originally scheduled June 28, was moved to October 4 in the first revision.  Lime Rock (GTLM/GTD) was moved from July 18 to October 31.  The Virginia International Raceway date was moved from Sunday to Saturday (August 22) in order to avoid a date clash with the 104th Indianapolis 500.

On June 25, IMSA announced further changes.  Watkins Glen and Lime Rock were moved up to consecutive weekends, September 6 and 12, while WeatherTech Raceway Laguna Seca, which had been on September 6, was moved to October 31.

However on August 1, IMSA removed the 6 Hours of The Glen and the Lime Rock round because of government regulations related to the New York and Connecticut quarantining restrictions. As a result, the 6 Hours of The Glen was replaced with a second race at Michelin Raceway Road Atlanta, and the round on the road course of Charlotte Motor Speedway came into place of the Lime Rock event in October.

Entries

Daytona Prototype international (DPi)

Notes

Le Mans Prototype 2 (LMP2)
In accordance with the 2017 LMP2 regulations, all cars in the LMP2 class use the Gibson GK428 V8 engine.

GT Le Mans (GTLM)

GT Daytona (GTD)

Race results
Bold indicates overall winner.

Championship standings

Points systems
Championship points are awarded in each class at the finish of each event. Points are awarded based on finishing positions as shown in the chart below.

Drivers points
Points are awarded in each class at the finish of each event.

Team points
Team points are calculated in exactly the same way as driver points, using the point distribution chart. Each car entered is considered its own "team" regardless if it is a single entry or part of a two-car team.

Manufacturer points
There are also a number of manufacturer championships which utilize the same season-long point distribution chart. The manufacturer championships recognized by IMSA are as follows:

Daytona Prototype international (DPi): Engine & bodywork manufacturer
GT Le Mans (GTLM): Car manufacturer
GT Daytona (GTD): Car manufacturer

Each manufacturer receives finishing points for its highest finishing car in each class. The positions of subsequent finishing cars from the same manufacturer are not taken into consideration, and all other manufacturers move up in the order.

Example: Manufacturer A finishes 1st and 2nd at an event, and Manufacturer B finishes 3rd. Manufacturer A receives 35 first-place points while Manufacturer B would earn 32 second-place points.

Michelin Endurance Cup
The points system for the Michelin Endurance Cup is different from the normal points system. Points are awarded on a 5–4–3–2 basis for drivers, teams and manufacturers. The first finishing position at each interval earns five points, four points for second position, three points for third, with two points awarded for fourth and each subsequent finishing position.

At Daytona (24 hour race), points are awarded at six hours, 12 hours, 18 hours and at the finish. At the Sebring (12 hour race), points are awarded at four hours, eight hours and at the finish. At the Michelin Raceway September round (6 hour race), points are awarded at three hours and at the finish. At the Michelin Raceway October round (10 hour race), points are awarded at four hours, eight hours and at the finish.

Like the season-long team championship, Michelin Endurance Cup team points are awarded for each car and drivers get points in any car that they drive, in which they are entered for points. The manufacturer points go to the highest placed car from that manufacturer (the others from that manufacturer not being counted), just like the season-long manufacturer championship.

For example: in any particular segment manufacturer A finishes 1st and 2nd and manufacturer B finishes 3rd. Manufacturer A only receives first-place points for that segment. Manufacturer B receives the second-place points.

Drivers' championships

Daytona Prototype international

Le Mans Prototype 2

† Points only counted towards the Michelin Endurance Cup, and not the overall LMP2 Championship.

GT Le Mans

GT Daytona

† Points only counted towards the WeatherTech Sprint Cup and not the overall GTD Championship.

Team's Championships

Standings: Daytona Prototype international

Standings: Le Mans Prototype 2

† Points only counted towards the Michelin Endurance Cup and not the overall LMP2 Championship.

Standings: GT Le Mans

Standings: GT Daytona

† Points only counted towards the WeatherTech Sprint Cup and not the overall GTD Championship.

Manufacturer's Championships

Standings: Daytona Prototype international

Standings: GT Le Mans

Standings: GT Daytona

† Points only counted towards the WeatherTech Sprint Cup and not the overall GTD Championship.

References

External links

 
WeatherTech SportsCar Championship seasons
WeatherTech SportsCar Championship